Winans may refer to:

Gospel music group
 The Winans, an American gospel music quartet
 The Winans family of musicians, related to The Winans, including:
 The family patriarch, Pop Winans (1934-2009)
 Angie & Debbie, a duo of Winans family members
 Benjamin "BeBe" Winans (born 1962)
 Priscilla "CeCe" Winans (born 1964)
 BeBe & CeCe Winans, a duo of the preceding two Winans family members
 Deborah Joy Winans (born 1983)
 Juan Winans (born 1981)
 Mario Winans (born 1974)
 Marvin Winans (born 1958)
 Marvin Winans Jr (born 1979)
 Ronald Winans (1956-2005)
 Vickie Winans (born 1953)

Other people with the surname Winans
 A. D. Winans (born 1936), American poet
 Ada Winans, American opera singer who married Russian diplomat Peter Troubetzkoy
 Edwin B. Winans (1826-1894), Governor of Michigan
 Edwin B. Winans (1869-1947), U. S. Army general
 Fonville Winans (1911-1992), American photographer
 George Winans (1839-1926), member of Wisconsin state assembly
 James J. Winans (1818-1879), U. S. representative from Ohio
 Jamin Winans (born 1977) and Kiowa K. Winans, filmmakers
 John Winans (1831-1907), U. S. representative from Wisconsin
 R. Foster Winans (born 1948), author and former Wall Street Journal columnist
 Ross Winans (1796-1877), American inventor
 Roswell Winans (1887-1968), U. S. Marine Corps general and Congressional Medal of Honor recipient
 Sam Winans, film and television composer
 Tydus Winans (born 1972), American football player
 Walter W. Winans (1852-1920), American marksman, horse breeder, sculptor, and painter
 William Parkhurst Winans (1836-1917), American banker and historian

Other people
 Charles Winans Chipp (1848-1881), American naval officer and Arctic explorer
 Gideon Winans Allen (born 1835), member of the Wisconsin State Assembly
 Jason Irvin Winans Dozzell (born 1967), English former professional association footballer
 Lewis Winans Ross (1812-1895), U. S. representative from Illinois
 Wynant (disambiguation), a similar surname which includes Winant, Wijnants and Wynants.

Places
 Mount Winans, Baltimore, a community of Baltimore, Maryland
 Winans Creek, a river in Texas

Other
 United States v. Winans, a landmark U. S. Supreme Court decision
 Winans Camel, a type of steam locomotive
 Winans Cigar Ship, an innovative ship design
 Winans Steam Gun, an early machine gun

See also